1191 Alfaterna, provisional designation , is a carbonaceous asteroid from the outer region of the asteroid belt, approximately 43 kilometers in diameter. It was discovered on 11 February 1931, by Italian astronomer Luigi Volta at the Observatory of Turin in northwestern Italy. The asteroid was named for the ancient Roman town of Nuceria Alfaterna.

Orbit and classification 

Alfaterna orbits the Sun in the outer main-belt at a distance of 2.8–3.0 AU once every 4 years and 11 months (1,797 days). Its orbit has an eccentricity of 0.05 and an inclination of 18° with respect to the ecliptic.

The first unused observation was taken at Heidelberg two nights prior to its discovery. The body's observation arc begins at Pino Torinese one week after its official discovery observation.

Physical characteristics 

Alfaterna has been characterized as a carbonaceous C-type asteroid.

Rotation period 

From 2005 to 2015, several astronomers such as Donald Pray, Henk de Groot and Raoul Behrend, Federico Manzini, as well as Laurent Bernasconi unsuccessfully tried to obtain a well-defined lightcurve of Alfaterna. While Pray derived a period of 3.664 hours with an amplitude of 0.05 magnitude, the European astronomers published a tentative period of 33.12 hours. As of 2017, the body's spin rate effectively remains unknown.

Diameter and albedo 

According to the surveys carried out by the Infrared Astronomical Satellite IRAS, the Japanese Akari satellite, and NASA's Wide-field Infrared Survey Explorer with its subsequent NEOWISE mission, Alfaterna measures between 38.92 and 47.397 kilometers in diameter and its surface has an albedo between 0.04 and 0.0574 (without preliminary results). The Collaborative Asteroid Lightcurve Link derives an albedo of 0.0479 and a diameter of 42.01 kilometers using an absolute magnitude of 10.8.

Naming 

This minor planet is named for the ancient Roman town of "Nuceria Alfaterna", where now the town Nocera Inferiore/Superiore is located. The ancient city was founded between Pompeii and Salerno in 10th century BC. In 1957, the name was suggested by astronomer Alfonso Fresa at Turin Observatory. The official  was published by the Minor Planet Center on 15 July 1968.

Notes

References

External links 
 Asteroid Lightcurve Database (LCDB), query form (info )
 Dictionary of Minor Planet Names, Google books
 Asteroids and comets rotation curves, CdR – Observatoire de Genève, Raoul Behrend
 Discovery Circumstances: Numbered Minor Planets (1)-(5000) – Minor Planet Center
 
 

001191
Discoveries by Luigi Volta
Named minor planets
001191
19310211